Tarren Otte (born 29 March 1984) is an Australian Olympic synchronized swimmer. She was selected to represent Australia at the 2008 and 2012 Summer Olympics in synchronized swimming.

Personal
Otte was born on 29 March 1984 in Victoria. She earned a Bachelor of Applied Science, enabling her to teach physical education.  , she lives in Port Melbourne.

Synchronized swimming
Otte is a synchronized swimmer, starting in the sport when she was nine years old.  She also coaches other synchronized swimmers in Melbourne.  Continuing to be involved with sport at times was a struggle because of the finances involved in competing.

In 2007, Otte competed at the FINA world championships in the team event.  The ten person team was the first Australian one to make it in the finals for the synchronised swimming free combination routine. As a nineteen-year-old, she competed in the 2008 Summer Olympics. Part of the team's routine included pretending to be emus, kangaroos and crocodiles. Her team came in seventh,  scoring 40,417 in the technical routine, 41,750 in the free routine, 41,333 in technical merit, and 42,167 in artistic impression.  During the Games, she had a lucky towel.

Otte competed at the 2010 Commonwealth Games and failed to make the podium. She was in fifth place with a score of 39.334 following the first part of the competition. Following the second routine, she finished in fourth place after beating Katrina Abdul Hadi of Malaysia and missing bronze by two points.  She had been considered a medal contender going into the Games.  Following the Commonwealth Games, she briefly retired from the sport.

Otte was selected to represent Australia at the 2012 Summer Olympics in synchronized swimming. As a twenty-seven-year-old, she was the oldest member of the team. The FINA World Championships held in Shanghai, China served as the 2012 Olympic qualifying event for the team. In the technical team portion, her team finished 18th  and in the Free Team event, her team finished 17th.

References

Living people
1984 births
Australian synchronised swimmers
Olympic synchronised swimmers of Australia
Synchronized swimmers at the 2008 Summer Olympics
Synchronized swimmers at the 2012 Summer Olympics
Synchronised swimmers at the 2010 Commonwealth Games
Commonwealth Games competitors for Australia
People from Port Melbourne
Swimmers from Melbourne
Sportswomen from Victoria (Australia)